Jamie Miller may refer to:

Jamie Miller (singer), British singer
Jamie Miller (American musician), American rock guitarist and drummer

See also
James Miller (disambiguation)